The men's 440 yards event at the 1930 British Empire Games was held on 21 and 23 August at the Civic Stadium in Hamilton, Canada.

Medalists

Results

Heats
Qualification: First 2 in each heat (Q) qualify directly for the final.

Final

References

Athletics at the 1930 British Empire Games
1930